Australian National University 
 La Trobe University 
 Macquarie University 
 Monash University 
 University of Adelaide 
 University of Melbourne 
 University of Newcastle 
 University of New England 
 University of New South Wales 
 University of Queensland 
 University of Sydney 
 University of Western Australia 
 University of Western Sydney 
 
 Universidade de São Paulo 
 
 Brock University 
 Carleton University, Ottawa  (BA MA)  (MA)
 Concordia University 
 McGill University, Montréal  (BA MA PhD)
 McMaster University 
 Memorial University of Newfoundland 
 Simon Fraser University 
 Trinity Western University 
 Université de Montréal  (BA MA PhD)
 Université du Québec à Chicoutimi  (BA MA) 
 Université du Québec à Montréal (BA MA PhD) 
 Université Laval  (BA MA PhD)
 University of Alberta 
 University of British Columbia 
 University of Calgary 
 University of Manitoba  (BA MA PhD)
 University of Ottawa, Ottawa  (BA MA PhD)
 University of Saskatchewan 
 University of Toronto, Toronto  (BA MA PhD)
 University of Victoria 
 York University, Toronto  (BA MA PhD)
 
 University of Zadar 
 University of Zagreb 
 
 Charles University in Prague 
 
 Aarhus University 
 University of Copenhagen 
 
 Tallinn University 
 University of Tartu 
 
 University of Jyväskylä 
 
 Bielefeld University 
 University of Cologne 
 Saarland University 
 University of Erlangen-Nuremberg 
 University of Potsdam 
 University of Tübingen 
 
 The University of Hong Kong 
 The Chinese University of Hong Kong 
 City University of Hong Kong 
 
 English and Foreign Languages University 
 University of Hyderabad
 Jawaharlal Nehru University Jawaharlal Nehru University
 Delhi University
 Deccan College Post-Graduate and Research Institute Deccan College Post-Graduate and Research Institute
 
 University of Tehran 
 Allameh Tabatabaee University
 Bu-Ali Sina University
 Isfahan University
 Ferdowsi University of Mashhad
 Tarbiat Modares University
 Shiraz University
 Institute for Humanities and Cultural Studies(MA PhD)
 University of Birjand
 
 Leiden University 
 Radboud University Nijmegen 
 
 University of Canterbury 
 
 New University of Lisbon 
 
 Moscow State University 
 Saint Petersburg State University 
 
 University of Belgrade 
 
 Nanyang Technological University 
 
 University of Ljubljana  (BA MA PhD)
 
 Stockholm University 
 University of Gothenburg 
 Uppsala University 
 
 University of Berne 
 University of Zurich 
 
 Chulalongkorn University  (MA PhD)
 King Mongkut's University of Technology Thonburi
 Mahachulalongkornrajavidyalaya University (MA)
 Mahidol University (MA PhD)
 Naresuan University  (MA PhD)
 Payap University  (MA)
 Srinakharinwirot University  (MA)
 Thammasat University  (BA MA PhD)
 
 Boğaziçi University 
 Hacettepe University 
 Ankara University 
 
 Bangor University 
 University of Cambridge 
 University of Edinburgh 
 University of Essex 
 Lancaster University 
 University of Oxford 
 Queen Mary, University of London 
 SOAS, University of London 
 University of York 
 University College London 
 York St John University 
 
 Boston University 
 Brigham Young University 
 Brandeis University 
 Brown University 
 Bucknell University 
 California State University, Long Beach 
 California State University, Northridge 
 Carleton College 
 Columbia University 
 Cornell University  (BA MA PhD)
 Dartmouth College 
 Duke University 
 George Mason University 
 Georgetown University 
 George Washington University 
 Georgia State University 
 Harvard 
 Iowa State University 
 Indiana University 
 Lawrence University 
 M.I.T. 
 Miami University 
 Michigan State University 
 New Mexico State University 
 New York University 
 Northeastern 
 Northwestern University 
 Ohio State University 
 Pennsylvania State University 
 Rice University 
 Rutgers 
 Southern Illinois University Carbondale 
 Stanford 
 Stony Brook University 
 Swarthmore College 
 Truman State University 
 University at Buffalo 
 University of Arizona 
 University of California, Berkeley 
 University of California, Davis 
 University of California, Los Angeles 
 University of California, Riverside 
 University of California, Santa Barbara 
 University of California, San Diego 
 University of California, Santa Cruz 
 University of Chicago 
 University of Colorado at Boulder 
 University of Delaware 
 University of Florida 
 University of Georgia 
 University of Hawaiʻi at Mānoa 
 University of Illinois at Urbana-Champaign 
 University of Iowa 
 University of Kansas 
 University of Kentucky 
 University of Maryland 
 University of Massachusetts Amherst 
 University of Massachusetts Boston 
 University of Mississippi 
 University of Michigan 
 University of New Mexico 
 University of North Carolina at Chapel Hill 
 University of North Dakota 
 University of Oregon 
 University of Pennsylvania 
 University of Pittsburgh 
 University of Rochester 
 University of South Carolina 
 University of Southern California 
 University of Tennessee 
 University of Texas at Austin 
 University of Utah 
 University of Virginia 
 University of Washington 
 University of Wisconsin–Milwaukee 
 Wellesley College 
 Western Washington University 
 Yale

See also 

 Linguistics
 List of schools of linguistics

Linguistics lists
University and college departments by discipline
Higher education-related lists